Alpine is a fictional character from the G.I. Joe: A Real American Hero toyline, comic books and animated series. He is the G.I. Joe Team's mountain trooper and debuted in 1985.

Profile
His real name is Albert M. Pine, and his rank is that of corporal E-4. Alpine was born in Minidoka, Idaho. All subsequent releases of Alpine list his rank as that of Sergeant E-5 only the 1985 release listed his Rank as Corporal E-4.

He grew up in the "Snake River Plain", where mountains surrounded on all four sides. This affected his childhood, and he took up mountain climbing as a symbolic representation of overcoming his life. He continued this while working as an accountant for a large publishing firm. Alpine graduated from Ranger School at Fort Benning, and is a qualified expert with M-16, M-14, M-60 and M-1911A1 auto pistol.

Alpine is an expert climber, having mastered the challenge of climbing encumbered with weapons, armor, ammunition, communications equipment and other military gear. He has also made good use of his secondary military specialty, applying his refined approach to bookkeeping as a finance clerk. Alpine likes to remind his teammates that the FBI has apprehended more bad guys through accounting, than by kicking down doors. During his time with G.I. Joe, Alpine has also forged a strong friendship with Bazooka.

Toys
Alpine was first released as an action figure in 1985.

Comics

Marvel Comics
In the Marvel Comics G.I. Joe series, he first appeared in issue #45 (March 1986). He works with Quick Kick, Flint and Spirit; they invade Cobra Island in an attempt to rescue the rogue soldier Ripcord. Alpine then takes part in the G.I. Joe invasion of the Cobra-controlled town of Springfield. He is part of a Joe team that chases Zartan when he escapes from G.I. Joe headquarters. The team is thwarted by the Dreadnoks's new vehicle, the Thunder Machine.

He works closely with Airtight in the second issue of Special Missions. They work to neutralize a gas-weapon from WW II that was lost in a Greenland glacier. Alpine also appears in issue #25 of Special Missions. He assists other Joes, such as Lightfoot in neutralizing the threat of bomb-carrying terrorists from the fictional country of Darklonia.

Action Force
Alpine is part of a G.I. Joe squad that stops a Crimson Guard plan to blow up the Eiffel Tower.

Devil's Due comics
In the Devil's Due G.I. Joe series, he has a wife and one child. Alpine meets up with three of his friends in his new hometown of Delhi Hills. He spends some time drinking with Rock 'n Roll, Bazooka and Mutt at "Old Clyde's", a Delhi Hills bar. He talks about how he's not sure he wants to answer General Hawk's call to return to G.I. Joe, because he has a child now, an accounting job and a life at Delhi Hills. The four Joes soon learn that Old Clyde's and most of the town are a Cobra front, and are captured.

The four Joes manage to escape, partly due to the assistance of Mutt's dog Junkyard Jr. In the ensuing battle, they destroy the bar and many vehicles in the parking lot. However, when they call in backup, there is no evidence of any Cobra involvement. The group's veteran status assures that they are believed. Alpine and his friends are cleared of all doubt, when anonymous information leads to Cobra influence being discovered in Delhi Hills. Alpine is one of the many Joes to take part in the invasion of Cobra Island during the second Cobra civil war.

IDW
In the continuation of the Marvel continuity, Alpine is part of a four-man mission sent to rescue peace activist Adele Burkhart. The others on the ground with him are Muskrat, Torpedo and Long Range The actual rescue from captivity goes well but the pursuit from enemy forces does not.

Animated series

Sunbow
Alpine appears in the Sunbow G.I. Joe animated series, voiced by Lee Weaver. In his appearances, he was frequently partners with Bazooka on missions. Alpine first appeared in the 1985 five-part miniseries "The Pyramid of Darkness", in which he and Bazooka lead a group of Joes to attempt to stop Cobra forces led by Major Bludd from planting one of the cubes to the Pyramid of Darkness. Alpine breaks an icy platform near where the cube is placed by yodeling, helping Tollbooth lay a bridge for the Joes. He and Bazooka climb a mountain so they could make an ambush from behind, but are caught in an avalanche from Cobra attack. Alpine climbs out of the snow and helps an injured Bazooka out. The two Joes are attacked by a pair of leopard seals, but are rescued by Quick Kick. The three of them play a major role in the Joes' victory at the battle at Cobra Temple by yodeling, causing a large rock to fall and destroy a Cobra weapon.

G.I. Joe: The Movie
Alpine has a minor role in the 1987 animated film G.I. Joe: The Movie. In the opening sequence, Alpine is seen roping a Cobra Firebat plane and punching in its cockpit while defending the Statue of Liberty. In the film, he, Bazooka, and Gung-Ho are charged with guarding the captured Serpentor. Lt. Falcon is supposed to be guarding the front, but deserts his post and leaves the Joes open to attack by the Dreadnoks, who blast their way into the facility. During the ensuing firefight, the three Joes are overpowered and incapacitated by Nemesis Enforcer.

Other media
Alpine is mentioned as a "unique character" in an essay, in the non-fiction book Integrating English: developing English language and literacy in the multilingual classroom.

References

External links
 Alpine at JMM's G.I. Joe Comics Home Page

Black characters in animation
Black people in comics
Fictional African-American people
Fictional characters from Idaho
Fictional corporals
Fictional gunfighters
Fictional military sergeants
Fictional United States Army personnel
Fictional United States Army Rangers personnel
G.I. Joe soldiers
Male characters in animated series
Male characters in comics
Television characters introduced in 1985